The Guggenheim Museum Bilbao is a museum of modern and contemporary art designed by Canadian-American architect Frank Gehry, and located in Bilbao, Basque Country, Spain. The museum was inaugurated on 18 October 1997 by King Juan Carlos I of Spain, with an exhibition of 250 contemporary works of art. Built alongside the Nervion River, which runs through the city of Bilbao to the Cantabrian Sea, it is one of several museums belonging to the Solomon R. Guggenheim Foundation and features permanent and visiting exhibits of works by Spanish and international artists. It is one of the largest museums in Spain.

One of the most admired works of contemporary architecture, the building has been hailed as a "signal moment in the architectural culture", because it represents "one of those rare moments when critics, academics, and the general public were all completely united about something", according to architectural critic Paul Goldberger. The museum was the building most frequently named as one of the  most important works completed since 1980 in the 2010 World Architecture Survey among architecture experts.

History

Founding
In 1991, the Basque government suggested to the Solomon R. Guggenheim Foundation that it would fund a Guggenheim museum to be built in Bilbao's decrepit port area, once the city's main source of income. The Basque government agreed to cover the US$100 million construction cost, to create a US$50 million acquisitions fund, to pay a one-time US$20 million fee to the Guggenheim and to subsidize the museum's US$12 million annual budget. In exchange, the foundation agreed to manage the institution, rotate parts of its permanent collection through the Bilbao museum and organize temporary exhibitions.

The museum was built by Ferrovial, at a cost of US$89 million.  About 5,000 residents of Bilbao attended a preopening extravaganza outside the museum on the night preceding the official opening, featuring an outdoor light show and concerts. On 18 October 1997 the museum was opened by Juan Carlos I of Spain.
On the 13th, two ETA militants had shot dead a Basque policeman who interrupted their attempt to set up grenade launchers to attack the opening.

Urdaibai expansion
In 2008, the Guggenheim Museum Bilbao announced that it was looking into building a  expansion in Urdaibai, an estuary to the east of Bilbao. By 2022, the government of the Biscay province presented plans to put 40 million euros toward the expansion.

Building

Architecture 
The Solomon R. Guggenheim Foundation selected Frank Gehry as the architect, and its director, Thomas Krens, encouraged him to design something daring and innovative.  The curves on the exterior of the building were intended to appear random; the architect said that "the randomness of the curves are designed to catch the light". The interior "is designed around a large, light-filled atrium with views of Bilbao's estuary and the surrounding hills of the Basque country". The atrium, which Gehry nicknamed The Flower because of its shape, serves as the organizing center of the museum.

When the Guggenheim Museum Bilbao opened to the public in 1997, it was immediately hailed as one of the world's most spectacular buildings in the style of Deconstructivism (although Gehry does not associate himself with that architectural movement), a masterpiece of the 20th century. Architect Philip Johnson described it as "the greatest building of our time", while critic Calvin Tomkins, in The New Yorker, characterized it as "a fantastic dream ship of undulating form in a cloak of titanium," its brilliantly reflective panels also reminiscent of fish scales. Herbert Muschamp praised its "mercurial brilliance" in The New York Times Magazine.  The Independent calls the museum "an astonishing architectural feat".

The museum is seamlessly integrated into the urban context, unfolding its interconnecting shapes of stone, glass and titanium on a  site along the Nervión River in the ancient industrial heart of the city; while modest from street level, it is most impressive when viewed from the river. The 11,000 m2 of exhibition space are distributed over nineteen galleries, ten of which follow a classic orthogonal plan that can be identified from the exterior by their stone finishes. The remaining nine galleries are irregularly shaped and can be identified from the outside by their swirling organic forms and titanium cladding. The largest gallery measures 30 meters wide and 130 meters long (98 ft × 427 ft). In 2005, it housed Richard Serra's monumental installation The Matter of Time, which Robert Hughes dubbed "courageous and sublime".

The building was constructed on time and budget, which is rare for architecture of this type. In an interview in Harvard Design Magazine, Gehry explained how he did it. First, he ensured that what he calls the "organization of the artist" prevailed during construction, to prevent political and business interests from interfering with the design. Second, he made sure he had a detailed and realistic cost estimate before proceeding. Third, he used computer visualizations produced by Rick Smith employing Dassault Systemes' CATIA V3 software and collaborated closely with the individual building trades to control costs during construction.

KLM Royal Dutch Airlines donated $1,000,000 towards its construction.

Foundation 

The building sits on a clay base from the bed of the nearby Estuary of Bilbao and required the embedment of 665 pilings piles, driven into the ground by boring machines.

Cladding 

The base of the building is covered with beige limestone from the Huéscar quarries near Granada, cut from 5 cm thick slabs. The building is clear thanks to the walls, specially treated to protect the interior from the effects of the sun. The glass of the windows has also been treated to prevent light from damaging the exposed pieces.

It is clad in titanium plates, arranged in scales, on a galvanized steel structure. The museum's exterior skin is made of 33,000 titanium plates, a material that has been used to replace copper or lead because of their toxicity. Many tests have been carried out with different materials to find one that would withstand heat and bad weather, while maintaining its character. It was during this research process that tests were started on titanium samples and the best treatment was found.

Its lamination process is delicate and has to be done in places with high energy sources, that's why the laminated parts were made in Pittsburgh, in the United States, the rolling allowed to obtain titanium plates only 0.4mm thick, which is much thinner than if steel plates had been used. Moreover, titanium is about half the weight of steel, and the museum's titanium coating represents only 60 tons.

During the conception, the pieces were designed to resist the bad weather, that is why a quilted rather than undulated shape was chosen, to resist the wind, and to avoid vibrations during storms.

Titanium is a low-polluting material, and each part has been designed differently according to its orientation on the building, so they correspond perfectly with the curves desired by Frank Gehry.

Virtual Building
In the fall of 1993, architects at Gehry Partners began to utilize Dassault Systèmes' CATIA software for the schematic design phase of the Guggenheim Museum Bilbao to digitize and model the exterior of the museum project. Essentially, this software calculates point by point the stresses to which materials are subjected, by generating a 3D model showing the different tensions and allowing the values of many structural elements of the museum to be calculated: the steel structure, titanium cladding or foundations, among others. It also helped to automate the cutting of materials such as stone or titanium plates.

The architects applied Master Modeling and Virtual Build Processes they learned from Rick Smith and his use of the same techniques on the Walt Disney Concert Hall during the previous two years. The success and global awareness of the Guggenheim Museum Bilbao ushered in a new era of Virtual Building and was a catalyst for what would become popularly known as Building Information Modeling seven years later.

Pulitzer prize winning architectural critic Paul Goldberger shares the words of others that Bilbao "could not have been constructed without CATIA". He further relays that Bilbao "was the first building for which CATIA played a role in almost every aspect of the design and construction process".

Exhibitions
The museum notably houses "large-scale, site-specific works and installations by contemporary artists", such as Richard Serra's 100-meter-long (340 ft) Snake, and displays the work of Basque artists, "as well as housing a selection of works" from the foundation's modern art collection.  In 1997, the museum opened with "The Guggenheim Museums and the Art of This Century", a 300-piece overview of 20th-century art from Cubism to new media art. Most pieces came from the Guggenheim's permanent collection, but the museum also acquired paintings by Willem de Kooning, Mark Rothko and Clyfford Still and commissioned new works by Francesco Clemente, Anselm Kiefer, Jenny Holzer and Richard Serra.

The exhibitions change often; the museum generally hosts thematic exhibitions, centered for example on Chinese or Russian art.  Traditional paintings and sculptures are a minority compared to installations and electronic forms.  The highlight of the collection, and its only permanent exhibit, is The Matter of Time (incorporating an earlier work, Snake), a series of weathering steel sculptures designed by Serra, which is housed in the 130-meter Arcelor Gallery (formerly known as the Fish Gallery but renamed in 2005 for the steel manufacturer that sponsored the project).  The collections usually highlight Avant-garde art, 20th century abstraction, and non-objective art.  When the museum announced the 2011 exhibition "The Luminous Interval", a show of artwork belonging to Greek businessman Dimitris Daskalopoulos, who is also a museum trustee, this met with criticism of, among other things, too much curatorial power for a serious benefactor. In 2005, Olivier Berggruen and Ingrid Pfeiffer curated a retrospective of Yves Klein.
In 2012 David Hockney's exhibition  drew over 290,000 visitors to the museum.

Economic and media impact
The museum was opened as part of a revitalization effort for the city of Bilbao. Almost immediately after its opening, the Guggenheim Bilbao became a popular tourist attraction, drawing visitors from around the globe. In its first three years, almost 4 million tourists visited the museum, helping to generate about €500 million in economic activity. The regional council estimated that the money visitors spent on hotels, restaurants, shops and transport allowed it to collect €100 million in taxes, which more than paid for the building cost.

The building was featured in the 1999 James Bond film The World Is Not Enough in the pre-title sequence and the Tamil film Sivaji (2007), in which it is the setting for the music video of the song "Style", composed by A. R. Rahman.  Mariah Carey's music video "Sweetheart", directed by Hype Williams, shows singers Jermaine Dupri and Carey in various locations at the Guggenheim Museum Bilbao.

Criticism
The so-called "Bilbao effect" refers to how the museum transformed the city. The term, however, has also been employed by critics who have denounced the museum as a symbol of gentrification and cultural imperialism. The Wall Street Journal suggested that the Bilbao effect should be called the Bilbao anomaly, "for the iconic chemistry between the design of building, its image and the public turns out to be rather rare."

Art critic Brian O'Doherty was positive about approaching the building but criticized the museum's interior effect, saying "[O]nce you get indoors things are a little different. Even the so-called site-specific works didn't look too happy to me. Most of the interior spaces are too vast." He went on to describe how works by Braque, Picasso and Rodchenko "looked absurd" and tiny on the museum's walls.

Controversy

Management and 2007 embezzlement incident
According to a report issued in 2007 by the Basque Court of Auditors, the museum paid more than US$27 million for the acquisition of art between 2002 and 2005, including Serra's The Matter of Time for the cavernous ground-floor gallery. After another audit in 2008 revealed that money was missing from accounts, the foundation said that it filed a case against the director, Roberto Cearsolo Barrenetxea, "for financial and accounting irregularities", asserting that he had admitted diverting money from two companies that manage the Guggenheim Bilbao building and its art collection to his own account since 1998.

2021–2022 strike
In 2021–2022, the 18 cleaners (mostly women) went on strike for 9 months until they got raises and full-time contracts.

Gallery

See also 
 World Architecture Survey
 12 Treasures of Spain
 Guggenheim family
 The Globalized City, a publication doing case studies on the museum as a large scale development project
 List of Guggenheim Museums

References 

 Cuito, Aurora, Pons, Eugeni, Guggenheim, 2001.
 Guggenheim Bilbao, 2000, Connaissance des Arts (Société Française de Promotion Artistique) ; no. especial.
 Sullivan, Edward J, Calvo Serraller, Francisco, Hunter, Sam, Forma eta figurazioa : Blake-Purnell bildumako maisu-lanak : [erakusketa, Guggenheim Bilbao Museoa], Museo Guggenheim Bilbao, 1998.

External links
 
Scholars on Bilbao - academic works that analyse Bilbao's urban regeneration
 Guggenheim Museum Bilbao - Project for Public Spaces Hall of Shame
 Pictures of the Guggenheim Museum Bilbao 
 Guggenheim Museum in an artistic short movie
 Bilbao. Basque Pathways to Globalization , an analysis of the relationships between the city of Bilbao and globalization.
Fabricating the Frank Gehry Legacy: The Story of the Evolution of Digital Practice in Frank Gehry's office.
Guggenheim Bilbao: 3D Model and animation
Tourism info about Bilbao: Interesting info about Guggenheim Museum´s city.

1997 establishments in Spain
Buildings and structures completed in 1997
Cultural tourism in Spain
Estuary of Bilbao
Expressionist architecture
Frank Gehry buildings
Modern art museums in Spain
Museums established in 1997
Museums in Bilbao